Ukraine was one of the founding members of the United Nations when it joined in 1945 as the Ukrainian Soviet Socialist Republic; along with the Byelorussian Soviet Socialist Republic, Ukraine signed the United Nations Charter when it was part of the Soviet Union. After the dissolution of the Soviet Union in 1991, the newly independent Ukraine retained its seat.

Activities in the United Nations
From 2016 to 2017, Ukraine served its fourth term as a non-permanent member in the United Nations Security Council in the Eastern European Group, having previously served its terms in 1948–49, 1984–85 and 2000–01.

Following the annexation of Crimea to Russia in 2014, UN member states voted to retain recognition of Crimea as part of Ukraine.

History

Ukraine in the Soviet Union (1945–1991)

Ukraine signed the Charter of the United Nations as the Ukrainian Soviet Socialist Republic on 26 June, 1945, and it came into force on 24 October, 1945. Ukraine was among the first countries that signed the United Nations Charter, becoming a founding member of the United Nations among 51 countries. This provided the Soviet Union (a permanent Security Council member with veto powers) with another vote in the General Assembly.

Dmitry Manuilsky, head of the Ukrainian delegation at the United Nations Conference on International Organization, held in April–June 1945 in San Francisco, was elected Chairman of the First Committee, which elaborated the Preamble and Chapter 1 (Purposes and Principles) of the United Nations Charter. Until 1958, the permanent mission of Ukraine was led by the Minister of Foreign Affairs rather than the permanent representative.

Another right that was granted but never used until 1991 was the right of the Soviet republics to secede from the union, which was codified in each of the Soviet constitutions. Accordingly, Article 69 of the Constitution of the Ukrainian SSR stated: "The Ukrainian SSR retains the right to willfully secede from the USSR." However, a republic's theoretical secession from the union was virtually impossible and unrealistic in many ways prior to Gorbachev's perestroika reforms.

Independent Ukraine (since 1991)
During the events of the dissolution of the Soviet Union, on 26 August, 1991, the Permanent Representative of the Ukrainian SSR, Hennadiy Udovenko, informed the office of the Secretary General of the United Nations that his permanent mission to the international assembly would officially be designated as representing Ukraine.

Since 1992, Ukraine has consistently supported peaceful, negotiated settlements to disputes. It has participated in the multilateral talks on the conflict in Moldova and promoted a peaceful resolution to conflict in the post-Soviet state of Georgia. Ukraine also has made a substantial contribution to UN peacekeeping operations.

During the Ukrainian crisis between 2013 and 2014, the UN adopted Resolution 68/262 on March 27, 2014, entitled Territorial integrity of Ukraine, by the sixty-eighth session of the United Nations General Assembly in response to the Russian annexation of Crimea. The non-binding resolution, which was supported by 100 United Nations member states, affirmed the General Assembly's commitment to the territorial integrity of Ukraine within its internationally recognized borders and underscored the invalidity of the 2014 Crimean referendum. Eleven nations voted against the resolution, while 58 abstained, and a further 24 states were absent when the vote took place.

See also

 Foreign relations of Ukraine
 Permanent Representative of Ukraine to the United Nations
 Eleventh emergency special session of the United Nations General Assembly
 United Nations General Assembly Resolution ES-11/1, "Aggression against Ukraine"

References

External links 
 Ministry of Foreign Affairs of Ukraine
 Permanent Mission of Ukraine to the United Nations
 United Nations Ukraine

 
United Nations
United Nations relations